Naltrexone/bupropion, sold under the brand name Contrave among others, is a fixed-dose combination medication for the management of chronic obesity in adults in combination with a reduced-calorie diet and increased physical activity. It contains naltrexone, an opioid antagonist, and bupropion, an aminoketone antidepressant. It is taken by mouth. Both medications have individually shown some evidence of effectiveness in weight loss, and the combination has been shown to have some synergistic effects on weight.

In September 2014, a sustained release formulation of the drug was approved for marketing in the United States under the brand name Contrave. The combination was subsequently approved in the European Union in the spring of 2015, where it is sold under the name Mysimba. It was approved in Canada under the Contrave brand name in 2018.

Medical uses
Naltrexone/bupropion is indicated, as an adjunct to a reduced-calorie diet and increased physical activity, as anti-obesity medication for the management of weight in adults with an initial body mass index (BMI) of:

 30 kg/m2 (obese), or
 27 kg/m2 to < 30 kg/m2, (overweight) in the presence of one or more weight-related comorbidities, like type 2 diabetes, dyslipidaemia, or controlled high blood pressure

Available forms
Each Contrave tablet contains 8 mg naltrexone and 90 mg bupropion. Once full dosing is reached (after 4 weeks of administration), the total dosage of Contrave for overweightness or obesity is two tablets twice daily or 32 mg naltrexone and 360 mg bupropion per day.

Contraindications
The manufacturer recommends against its use in people that have/are:
 History of seizures
 History of an eating disorder such as bulimia nervosa or anorexia nervosa 
 Taking opioid pain medicines, taking medicines to stop opioid addiction, or are in opiate withdrawal
 Taking an MAOI or have taken an MAOI in the last 14 days
 Pregnant
 Abruptly stopped using: alcohol, benzodiazepines, barbiturates, or antiepileptic drugs

Adverse effects
The U.S. Food and Drug Administration (FDA) has put a boxed warning onto this medicine because it may affect mood and increase the likelihood of suicidal thoughts in people under 25 years old. This is attributed to the bupropion component, as antidepressants have been associated with increased risk of suicidal thoughts, but not suicide, and only in people younger than 25.

The safety and effectiveness in children under the age of 18 has not been studied.

Mechanism of action
Individually, naltrexone and bupropion each target pathways in the central nervous system that influence appetite and energy use. 
Bupropion is a reuptake inhibitor and releasing agent of both norepinephrine and dopamine, and a nicotinic acetylcholine receptor antagonist, and it activates proopiomelanocortin (POMC) neurons in the hypothalamus which give an effect downstream, resulting in loss of appetite and increased energy output. The POMC is regulated by endogenous opioids via opioid-mediated negative feedback.
Naltrexone is a pure opioid antagonist, which further augments bupropion's activation of the POMC.

Combined, naltrexone/bupropion has an effect on the reward pathway that results in reduced food craving. In 2009, Monash University physiologist Michael Cowley was awarded one of Australia's top research honors, the Commonwealth Science Minister's Prize for Life Scientist of the Year, in recognition of his elucidation of these pathways, which led to the development of the combination medication.

History
Orexigen submitted a New Drug Application (NDA) for this drug combination to the U.S. Food and Drug Administration (FDA) on 31 March 2010. Having paid a fee under the Prescription Drug User Fee Act, Orexigen was given a deadline for the FDA to approve or reject the drug of 31 January 2011. On 7 December 2010, an FDA Advisory Committee voted 13-7 for the approval of Contrave, and voted 11-8 for the conduct of a post-marketing cardiovascular outcomes study. Subsequently, on 2 February 2011, the FDA rejected the drug and it was decided that an extremely large-scale study of the long-term cardiovascular effects of Contrave would be needed, before approval could be considered. It was ultimately approved in the United States in the fall of 2014.

In December 2014, the EU's Committee for Medicinal Products for Human Use (CHMP) endorsed the combination for licensure as an obesity medication when used alongside diet and exercise. Approval was granted in late March 2015.

In May 2015, Orexigen ended a safety study of its diet drug earlier than planned, because an independent panel of experts says the drug maker “inappropriately” compromised the trial by prematurely releasing interim data. The early data release reported a reduction in heart attacks that was no longer observed when a more complete view of the data was analyzed.

In 2018, Orexigen sold its assets, including Contrave, to Nalpropion Pharmaceuticals.

On 22 September 2020, the FDA issued a Warning Letter to Nalpropion Pharmaceuticals LLC on concerns of a sponsored Google link making "false or misleading claims about the risks associated with and efficacy of Contrave" on multiple issues. Nalproprion subsequently issued "An important correction from CONTRAVE® (naltrexone HCl/bupropion HCl) Extended-Release Tablets"

Marketing and sales
The sustained-release formulation, Contrave, is marketed by Takeda under license from the combination medication's developer, Orexigen Therapeutics. As of 2015, Orexigen received 20% of net sales from Takeda.

Despite being initially impeded by technical issues, the growth in filled prescriptions in the first months after approval was very rapid — substantially exceeding the equivalent early uptake of either of the two alternative medications just cited.

Despite having been approved for use in Europe in March 2015, sales of Contrave have not begun as Orexigen has not yet found a marketing partner.

See also
 Bupropion/zonisamide
 Bupropion/dextromethorphan

References

External links
 

Anorectics
Antiobesity drugs
Combination drugs
Kappa-opioid receptor antagonists
Mu-opioid receptor antagonists
Norepinephrine releasing agents
Norepinephrine reuptake inhibitors
Nicotinic antagonists